John Claude Sanchez (October 12, 1920 – September 11, 1992) was an American football offensive tackle in the National Football League for the Detroit Lions, Washington Redskins, and the New York Giants.  He also played in the All-America Football Conference for the Chicago Rockets.  Sanchez played college football at the University of San Francisco and was drafted in the ninth round of the 1944 NFL Draft by the Giants.

1920 births
1992 deaths
Players of American football from Los Angeles
American football offensive tackles
San Francisco Dons football players
Chicago Rockets players
Detroit Lions players
Washington Redskins players
New York Giants players